Raúl Porras Barrenechea (23 March 1897 – 27 September 1960) was a Peruvian diplomat, historian and politician. He was President of the Senate in 1957 and Minister of Foreign Affairs between 1958 and 1960. A well-known figure of the student movement in San Marcos in the early 20th century, Porras became one of the most prominent hispanist historians of his generation and a leading figure of the Peruvian diplomacy.

Biography 
He was born in Pisco, Peru on 23 March 1897 into a prominent family. Porras was the nephew of Melitón Porras, a distinguished diplomat and a former Prime Minister and Minister of Foreign Affairs, and a grandson of José Antonio Barrenechea, several times Minister of Foreign Relations.

He was educated at the Recoleta Sacred Heart School of Lima and the University of San Marcos, where he obtained a degree in law in 1922 and a doctoral degree in philosophy, history and letters in 1928. While in San Marcos, Porras became a prominent figure in academic circles and a well-known leader of the so-called Centenary Generation. He was a student delegate to international conferences in La Paz, Buenos Aires and Mexico City, and was an active member of the University Reform movement.

In 1919, he was named personal secretary to the Minister of Foreign Affairs. Then, he was appointed librarian of the Ministry in 1922 and Adviser to the Peruvian Delegation in the Plebiscitary Commission for the Tacna-Arica Affair in 1924. In 1926, he was appointed Chief of the Archive of Limits, the cartographic department of the Ministry, and Representative to the Centenary of the Panama Congress.

In 1928, Porras, already a respected academic and published author, entered San Marcos obtaining a tenure position. He subsequently taught Spanish literature, history of Peru and diplomatic history. In 1933, he also started to teach at the Catholic University of Lima. During these years, he published several historical biographies and researches on the colonial period.

In 1934, he moved to Europe. In Spain, he conducted research at the General Archive of the Indies, the National Historical Archive and the Library of the Royal Palace of Madrid. Next year, Porras was appointed Counsellor of the Peruvian legation in Madrid and, in 1936, he was appointed Representative to the League of Nations in Geneva, a post he occupied until 1938. Before returning to his country in 1940, he edited some of the works of César Vallejo in Paris and continued his research at the Spanish archives.

In 1941, Porras was appointed Adviser to the Ministry and Chief of the Press Office. He was subsequently promoted to the ranks of Minister Plenipotentiary and Ambassador in 1942 and 1944, respectively. He entered the Hispanic Society of America in 1944 and obtained the National Prize of History in 1945. In 1948, he was appointed Ambassador to Spain. Upon his return in 1950, he was named Director of the Institute of History of San Marcos and was elected President of the Peruvian Institute of Hispanic Culture.

In 1956, he was elected Senator and that same year Vice President of his chamber. In 1957, he became President of the Senate for six months due to the sudden death of José Gálvez. Next year, President Manuel Prado appointed him Minister of Foreign Affairs. He performed his duties as Minister with some interruptions due to his ill health. However, Porras attended the 13th General Assembly of the United Nations in 1958, the 14th General Assembly in 1959 and accompanied President Prado in his state visits to France, Italy and Germany in 1960. In August of this year, he attended the 8th Conference of American Ministers of Foreign Relations in Costa Rica and gave his historic speech against the new U.S. intervention in Cuba.

Seriously ill, Porras resigned on 12 September 1960, and died fifteen days later on 27 September.

See also
History of Peru

References

Works 
Historia de los Límites del Perú: Texto dictado a los alumnos del Colegio Anglo-Peruano de Lima, conforme al programa oficial. (Lima: F. y E. Rosay. 1930)
Las relaciones primitivas de la conquista del Perú. (Paris: Impr. Les Presses modernes. 1937)
El Inca Garcilaso de la Vega (1539–1616) (Lima: Lumen. 1946)
Relación de la descendencia de Garci Pérez de Vargas (1596). Inca Garcilaso de la Vega. Reproducción facsimilar del manuscrito original con un prólogo a cargo de Raúl Porras Barrenechea. (Lima: Instituto de Historia. 1951)
El Inca Garcilaso, en Montilla, 1561–1614" : nuevos documentos hallados y publicados. (Lima: Instituto de Historia-Editorial San Marcos 1955)
El Paisaje Peruano de Garcilaso a Riva Agüero. (Lima: Imprenta Santa María. 1955)
Cartas del Perú, 1524–1543. (Lima: Sociedad de Bibliófilos Peruanos. 1959)
Antología del Cusco. (Lima: Librería Internacional del Perú. 1961)
Fuentes Históricas Peruanas: Apuntes de un curso universitario. (Lima: Instituto Raúl Porras Barrenechea. 1963)
Los Cronistas del Perú. (Lima: Sanmartí Impresores. 1962)
Pizarro (Lima: Editorial Pizarro. 1978)

External links 

1897 births
1960 deaths
Presidents of the Senate of Peru
Historians of Peru
People from Pisco, Peru
Peruvian people of Spanish descent
Peruvian people of Basque descent
Foreign ministers of Peru
Grand Crosses 1st class of the Order of Merit of the Federal Republic of Germany